Gareth Gundrey (1893–1965) was a British producer, screenwriter and film director.

Selected filmography
Director
 Just for a Song (1930)
 Symphony in Two Flats (1930)
 The Stronger Sex (1931)
 The Hound of the Baskervilles (1932)

Producer
 Quinneys (1927)
 A Woman in Pawn (1927)
 The Flight Commander (1927)
 Mademoiselle Parley Voo (1928)
 Palais de danse (1928)
 Smashing Through (1929)

Screenwriter
 Roses of Picardy (1927)
 Balaclava (1928)

References

External links

1893 births
1965 deaths
British film directors
British film producers
British male screenwriters
People from Taunton
20th-century British screenwriters